Bibliography of the Soviet Union consists of the following sections:

 Bibliography of the Russian Revolution and Civil War
 Bibliography of Stalinism and the Soviet Union
 Bibliography of the Soviet Union during World War II
 Bibliography of the Post Stalinist Soviet Union

See also
 Bibliography of Russian history 
 Bibliography of Ukrainian history
 Bibliography of the history of Belarus and Byelorussia
 Bibliography of the history of Central Asia
 Bibliography of the history of the Caucasus
 Bibliography of the history of Poland
 List of Slavic studies journals
 Vladimir Lenin bibliography
 List of speeches given by Vladimir Lenin
 Leon Trotsky bibliography
 Marxist bibliography

Bibliographies of wars and conflicts
Soviet Union
Russia
Books about the Soviet Union